The Supreme Court of the United States handed down eight per curiam opinions during its 2014 term, which began October 6, 2014 and concluded October 4, 2015.

Because per curiam decisions are issued from the Court as an institution, these opinions all lack the attribution of authorship or joining votes to specific justices. All justices on the Court at the time the decision was handed down are assumed to have participated and concurred unless otherwise noted.

Court membership

Chief Justice: John Roberts

Associate Justices: Antonin Scalia, Anthony Kennedy, Clarence Thomas, Ruth Bader Ginsburg, Stephen Breyer, Samuel Alito, Sonia Sotomayor, Elena Kagan

Lopez v. Smith

Johnson v. City of Shelby

Carroll v. Carman

Glebe v. Frost

Christeson v. Roper

Grady v. North Carolina

Woods v. Donald

Taylor v. Barkes

See also 
 List of United States Supreme Court cases, volume 574
 List of United States Supreme Court cases, volume 575

References

 

United States Supreme Court per curiam opinions
Lists of 2014 term United States Supreme Court opinions
2014 per curiam